The 1978 New Zealand Open, also known by its sponsored name Benson & Hedges New Zealand Open, was a men's professional tennis tournament held in Auckland, New Zealand. It was a non-tour event, i.e. not part of the 1978 Grand Prix circuit. It was the 11th edition of the tournament and was played on outdoor hard courts and was held from 2 January through 8 January 1978. Eliot Teltscher won the singles title.

Finals

Singles
 Eliot Teltscher defeated  Onny Parun 6–3, 7–5, 6–1

Doubles
 Chris Lewis /  Russell Simpson defeated  Rod Frawley /  Karl Meiler 6–1, 7–6

References

External links
 ATP – tournament profile
 ITF – tournament edition details

ATP Auckland Open
Heineken
Heineken
January 1978 sports events in New Zealand